{{Automatic taxobox
| image = Limnadia lenticularis detail (2877683685).jpg
| image_caption =  Limnadia lenticularis 
| taxon = Limnadiidae
| authority = Burmeister, 1843
| display_parents = 5
}}Limnadiidae' is a family of crustaceans in the order Spinicaudata that live in seasonal wetlands, inland saline pools and lakes. They are found on all the world's continents except Antarctica, and are distinguished from other families in the same order by the fact that the cephalic fornicies do not extend forwards. The family contains eight extant genera:Afrolimnadia Rogers et al., 2012Calalimnadia Rabet & Rogers, 2012Eulimnadia Packard, 1874Imnadia Hertzog, 1935Limnadia Brongniart, 1820Limnadopsis Spencer & Hall, 1896Metalimnadia Mattox, 1952Paralimnadia'' Sars, 1896

References

Spinicaudata
Crustacean families

pt:Imnadia
vi:Imnadia